Dave's Picks Volume 17 is a three-CD live album by the rock band the Grateful Dead.  It contains the complete concert recorded on July 19, 1974 at Selland Arena in Fresno, California.  It was produced in a limited edition of 16,500 numbered copies, and released on February 1, 2016.

Each year a different person creates the album cover art for the Dave's Picks albums.  For 2016 the designated artist was Justin Helton.

Critical reception

Stephen Thomas Erlewine, writing on AllMusic, said, "... the repertoire... doesn't distinguish this show as much as its muscular, elastic snap, where the band is equally eager to delve into funky murk and launch into outer space.... the real pleasure of the Fresno 1974 show is how it showcases everything the Dead could do at that moment—the burnished folk, the old-time rock & roll, the country and funk—and shows that the band was still finding ways to turn the whole thing inside out and back again."

Track listing
Disc 1
First set:
"Bertha" (Jerry Garcia, Robert Hunter) – 6:33
"Mexicali Blues" (Bob Weir, John Barlow) – 4:06
"Deal" (Garcia, Hunter) – 4:55
"Beat It On Down the Line" (Jesse Fuller) – 3:45
"Row Jimmy" (Garcia, Hunter) – 8:20
"Me and Bobby McGee" (Kris Kristofferson, Fred Foster) – 6:28
"Scarlet Begonias" (Garcia, Hunter) – 8:52
"El Paso" (Marty Robbins) – 4:39
"Tennessee Jed" (Garcia, Hunter) – 7:54
Disc 2
"Playing in the Band" (Weir, Mickey Hart, Hunter) – 29:14
Interlude:
"Seastones" (Phil Lesh, Ned Lagin) – 15:13
Second set:
"Brown-Eyed Women" (Garcia, Hunter) – 5:11
"Me and My Uncle" (John Phillips) – 3:11
"It Must Have Been the Roses" (Hunter) – 5:54
"Jack Straw" (Weir, Hunter) – 5:28
Disc 3
"He's Gone" > (Garcia, Hunter) – 14:55
"U.S. Blues" (Garcia, Hunter) – 5:55
"Weather Report Suite" > – 18:47
"Prelude" (Weir)
"Part 1" (Weir, Eric Andersen)
"Let It Grow" (Weir, Barlow)
"Jam" > (Grateful Dead) – 9:35
"Eyes of the World" > (Garcia, Hunter) – 16:32
"China Doll" (Garcia, Hunter) – 6:33
"One More Saturday Night" (Weir) – 5:21

Personnel
Grateful Dead
Jerry Garcia – lead guitar, vocals
Donna Jean Godchaux – vocals
Keith Godchaux – keyboards
Bill Kreutzmann – drums
Phil Lesh – electric bass, vocals
Bob Weir – rhythm guitar, vocals
Additional musicians
Ned Lagin – synthesizer and electronic keyboards on "Seastones"
Production
Produced by Grateful Dead
Produced for release by David Lemieux
Associate Producers: Doran Tyson & Ivette Ramos
CD mastering: Jeffrey Norman
Recording: Kidd Candelario
Art direction, design: Steve Vance
Cover art: Justin Helton
Photos: Kirk West
Liner notes: Nicholas G. Meriwether

References

2016 live albums
17
Rhino Entertainment live albums